Golf at the 2011 Pacific Games was held at the Tina Golf Club in Nouméa, New Caledonia on 31 August – 3 September 2011. The tournament was cut short during the fourth day after rain affected the course and all event placings were decided on scores from the first three rounds only.

Host country New Caledonia won all four gold medals (and seven medals in all), while Samoa, Tahiti and Cook Islands shared the remaining minor medals.

Medal summary

Medal table

Men's results

Women's results

See also
 Golf at the Pacific Games

References

2011 Pacific Games
Golf at the Pacific Games
2011 Pacific Games
Pacific Games